Brian Stewart (born December 4, 1964) is an American football coach who is the Defensive coordinator of the Houston Roughnecks. He was previously the defensive backs coach at Baylor University and defensive coordinator at Rice University for the 2017 season.

Early years
Stewart attended Nogales High School. He accepted a football scholarship from Northern Arizona University. He transferred to Santa Monica City College after his freshman season, when he was ruled academically ineligible. He played both at cornerback and free safety. 

He transferred for his junior season back to Northern Arizona University. He played cornerback for the 1986 and 1987 teams.

Coaching career

Cal Poly
Stewart began his collegiate career as an offensive assistant at Cal Poly-San Luis Obispo, working with the wide receivers in 1993 and the running backs in 1994, when the school won the American West Conference title.

Northern Arizona
In 1995, he coached tight ends and special teams at Northern Arizona University.

Missouri
In 1996, he was a defensive graduate assistant at the University of Missouri.

San Jose State
From 1997 to 1998, he was the secondary coach at San Jose State University.

Missouri (second stint)
From 1999 to 2000, he was the secondary coach at the University of Missouri.

Syracuse
In 2001, he was the defensive backs coach at Syracuse University under head coach Paul Pasqualoni, contributing to a 10-3 record and the No. 14 ranking in final Associated Press poll.

Houston Texans
In 2002, he began his NFL career as the assistant defensive backs coach with the expansion Houston Texans.

San Diego Chargers
In 2004, he was hired as the secondary coach with the San Diego Chargers under defensive coordinator Wade Phillips.

Dallas Cowboys
In 2007, when Phillips became the head coach of the Dallas Cowboys, he named Stewart as the defensive coordinator.

Philadelphia Eagles
In 2009, he was hired as the defensive special assistant with the Philadelphia Eagles.

Houston
Stewart held the position of defensive coordinator on the Houston Cougars football team from 2010 to 2011 at the University of Houston.

Maryland
In 2012, Stewart was hired as the defensive coordinator at the University of Maryland. Stewart's defense was second-ranked in yards per game in the Atlantic Coast Conference and the 21st in the nation.

Nebraska
Stewart was the defensive backs coach at the University of Nebraska from 2015 to 2016.

Rice
In 2017, he was the defensive coordinator and interim head coach at Rice University.

Detroit Lions
On February 7, 2018, Stewart was hired by the Detroit Lions as their defensive backs coach of the Detroit Lions under defensive coordinator Paul Pasqualoni and head coach Matt Patricia.

Baylor Bears
In 2020, Stewart was hired as the cornerbacks coach at Baylor University under head coach Dave Aranda.

Maryland (second stint)
On February 16, 2021, Stewart returned and was hired as the defensive coordinator at the University of Maryland under head coach Mike Locksley, replacing Jon Hoke, who departed to become the secondary coach for the Atlanta Falcons. He left the staff following the season.

XFL 
In June 2022, It was announced Stewart would become the XFL's Houston Roughnecks Defensive Coordinator.

Personal life
Stewart's family includes wife Kimberly and their children Leila, Mya, and Zara. He currently resides in Chandler, Arizona.

References

External links
 Baylor profile

1964 births
Living people
Players of American football from San Diego
American football cornerbacks
American football safeties
Northern Arizona Lumberjacks football players
Santa Monica Corsairs football players
Baylor Bears football coaches
Cal Poly Mustangs football coaches
Dallas Cowboys coaches
Detroit Lions coaches
Houston Cougars football coaches
Houston Roughnecks coaches
Houston Texans coaches
Maryland Terrapins football coaches
Missouri Tigers football coaches
Nebraska Cornhuskers football coaches
Northern Arizona Lumberjacks football coaches
Philadelphia Eagles coaches
San Diego Chargers coaches
San Jose State Spartans football coaches
Syracuse Orange football coaches